Ruby is a hardware description language designed by  in 1986 intended to facilitate the notation and development of integrated circuits via relational algebra and functional programming.

It should not be confused with RHDL, a hardware description language based on the 1995 Ruby programming language.

References

External links 

Hardware description languages